Roberto Candido (born 13 March 1993) is an Italian football player.

Club career
He made his Serie B debut for Sassuolo on 27 March 2011 in a game against Siena.

On 9 July 2015 Bassano announced to have signed him on a free transfer.

References

External links
 

1993 births
Sportspeople from Monza
Living people
Italian footballers
Association football midfielders
U.S. Sassuolo Calcio players
F.C. Südtirol players
A.C. Monza players
Aurora Pro Patria 1919 players
Bassano Virtus 55 S.T. players
Calcio Padova players
Rimini F.C. 1912 players
Serie B players
Serie C players
Footballers from Lombardy